The Little Red Schoolhouse, also known as the Columbia School District No. 5 Schoolhouse, is located at 203 Ridgedale Avenue in the borough of Florham Park in Morris County, New Jersey. It was added to the National Register of Historic Places on June 6, 1986, for its significance in architecture and education. It is now operated as a museum by The Historical Society of Florham Park.

History and description
Built in 1866, the schoolhouse is a vernacular Italianate one-story narrow red brick masonry building with a steep roof and tall 9/9 windows topped with gently arches.  In 1905, it was expanded from four bays to the current six.  The open belfry at the front peak with working bell and the gable-end entrance make it instantly identifiable as a typical 19th century one-room schoolhouse.

Its location at the historic crossroads of Florham Park has remained a key reminder of the borough's rural origins. The classic schoolhouse is the borough's icon, appearing on the town flag, letterhead, website, and public works and first responder vehicles.  
In 1978, the schoolhouse was moved back several yards to accommodate the expanded Columbia Turnpike.

Part of the museum is set up as a schoolroom from a century ago and mini lectures are offered for small groups of students and Scouts. Exhibits illustrate the development of Florham Park from a rural farming community, to the home of three major estates, and the community's growth into a modern suburb. As a museum it includes artifacts such as broom making equipment, old maps and old school desks, and more from the 1800s and 1900s.

See also
National Register of Historic Places listings in Morris County, New Jersey

References

External links
 
 

Florham Park, New Jersey
School buildings on the National Register of Historic Places in New Jersey
School buildings completed in 1866
Schools in Morris County, New Jersey
Defunct schools in New Jersey
National Register of Historic Places in Morris County, New Jersey
1866 establishments in New Jersey
New Jersey Register of Historic Places